Bernardo Pié (born 28 April 1995 in Bayaguana) is a Taekwondo athlete from Dominican Republic.

Career
He won one medal at the 2019 Pan American Games, and three medals at the Pan American Taekwondo Championships between 2014 and 2018.

He was selected to compete at the Taekwondo at the 2020 Summer Olympics – Men's 68 kg where he made it though to the semi finals.

Personal life
His older brother Luisito Pié is also a professional Taekwondo athlete.

References

External links
 

1995 births
Living people
People from Monte Plata Province
Dominican Republic people of Haitian descent
Dominican Republic male taekwondo practitioners
Olympic taekwondo practitioners of the Dominican Republic
Taekwondo practitioners at the 2020 Summer Olympics
Pan American Games medalists in taekwondo
Pan American Games silver medalists for the Dominican Republic
Medalists at the 2019 Pan American Games
21st-century Dominican Republic people